Carex foenea is a species of flowering plant in the family Cyperaceae, native from subarctic America to the northern United States. It was first described by Carl Ludwig Willdenow in 1809.

Some sources regard Carex foenea as a synonym of Carex siccata, others treat it as a full species.

References

foenea
Flora of Subarctic America
Flora of Western Canada
Flora of Eastern Canada
Flora of the Northwestern United States
Flora of the North-Central United States
Flora of the Northeastern United States
Plants described in 1809